William Wilson Naismith (1856 – 27 September 1935) was a Scottish accountant and mountaineer. He was a key founder of the Scottish Mountaineering Club and created the eponymous Naismith's rule, used to determine to the time necessary to walk a route with a given length and elevation gain.

Early life 
Naismith was the second of two children born to William Naismith, a physician, and Mary Anne Murray. He was raised in Hamilton, South Lanarkshire and attended Gilbertfield House School. He was introduced to mountain climbing in the Scottish Highlands at an early age by his parents; he had climbed Ben Lomond by the age of nine and made a winter ascent of Beinn Bhreac by fourteen. After school, he completed a degree in accounting at the University of Glasgow.

Climbing career 
Naismith began climbing seriously in the 1880s. His difficult ascent of Ben More in 1884 led him to the belief that Scotland's mountains demanded the same level of respect as those in the Alps, and in January 1889 he had a letter published in the Glasgow Herald proposing the formation of a "Scottish Alpine Club". After receiving numerous responses, he and others founded the Scottish Mountaineering Club in March 1889. Naismith, regarded as "the father of the club", was its first treasurer.

Naismith made several first ascents throughout his career. In 1894 he was the first to climb (and name) Tower Ridge on the UK's highest mountain, Ben Nevis; in 1896 he made the first winter ascent of the mountain's North-East Buttress; and in 1898 he ascended its Staircase Climb for the first time. He became the first to climb Crowberry Ridge of Buachaille Etive Mòr in 1896 by a route now known as Naismith's Route. He was also a proficient skier, and made the first recorded expedition on skis in Scottish history when he skied through the Campsie Fells in 1890. In 1895 he became the first person to explore a frozen-over Loch Lomond on ice skates.

He is perhaps best known for conceiving Naismith's rule, a method for estimating the amount of time it will take to walk a route according to its distance and elevation gain.

Later life 
Naismith lived in Glasgow from 1905 onwards and attended the Kelvinside Hillhead Parish Church, Glasgow where he was an elder for 27 years. He married Edith A.W. Barron in 1925 when he was 69 years old. He died on 27 September 1935 after falling ill suddenly, and was buried in his hometown of Hamilton.

References 

1856 births
1935 deaths
Scottish mountain climbers
Scottish accountants
Sportspeople from Hamilton, South Lanarkshire
Alumni of the University of Glasgow